Gibberula aquitanensis is an extinct species of sea snail, a marine gastropod mollusk, in the family Cystiscidae.

Description
The length of the shell attains 2.22 mm.

Distribution
This extinct species was found in Aquitanian strata in the Landes, France.

References

External links
 MNHN, Paris: holotype

aquitanensis
Gastropods described in 1998